2005 HC4 is the asteroid with the smallest known perihelion of any known object orbiting the Sun (except sungrazing comets). Its extreme orbital eccentricity brings it to within 0.071 AU of the Sun (23% of Mercury's perihelion) and takes it as far as 3.562 AU from the Sun (well beyond the orbit of Mars). Due to its very small perihelion and comparably large aphelion,  achieves the fastest speed of any known asteroid bound to the Solar System with a velocity of 157 km/s (565,000 km/h; 351,000 mi/h) at perihelion (there are comets, however, which obtain much higher speeds).

See also
 List of Mercury-crossing minor planets
 List of Venus-crossing minor planets
 Apollo asteroids
 List of Mars-crossing minor planets

References

External links 
 
 
 

Minor planet object articles (unnumbered)
Mercury-crossing asteroids
Venus-crossing asteroids
20050430